Nelson Betancourt ISO (4 June 1887 – 12 October 1947) was a cricketer, A Right Handed wicket keeper batsman. He was born in Trinidad and Tobago and died there.

His career, at first glance, was a long one spanning the years 1905 to 1930 but in truth he played only sporadically, with long periods of cricket inactivity.  His first-class debut came in Trinidad’s victory over Jamaica at Sabina Park, Kingston in August 1905, but it was more than two years before he made his second appearance.  His highest score, 71 not out, was scored against British Guiana in an Inter-Colonial tournament in 1928/29 but this was the only time that he surpassed fifty runs in an innings.

Betancourt’s sole Test for the West Indies came against England at Port of Spain, Trinidad in February, 1930, this being the second Test of the series.  In a match won by the visitors, he captained the West Indies (on account of the home team’s policy of having a different, indigenous captain for each match of the series) and scored 39 and 13.  At 42 years and 242 days old, Betancourt remains the oldest Test debutant for the West Indies.  His death in 1947 went unrecorded at the time and therefore no obituary appeared within the covers of Wisden for him.

He was latterly Assistant Inspector of Mines in Trinidad and sat occasionally in the Legislative Council. He received the Imperial Service Order upon his retirement in 1946.

References 
 World Cricketers – A Biographical Dictionary by Christopher Martin-Jenkins published by Oxford University Press (1996),
 The Wisden Book of Test Cricket, Volume 1 (1877–1977) compiled and edited by Bill Frindall published by Headline Book Publishing (1995),
 The Complete Record of West Indian Test Cricketers by Bridgette Lawrence & Ray Goble published by ACL & Polar Publishing (UK) Ltd. (1991),

External links
 

1887 births
1947 deaths
Pre-1928 West Indies cricketers
West Indies Test cricketers
Trinidad and Tobago cricketers
West Indies Test cricket captains
Wicket-keepers